Etonitazepyne (N-Pyrrolidino Etonitazene) is a benzimidazole derivative with potent opioid effects which has been sold over the internet as a designer drug and linked to numerous cases of overdose.

See also 
 Etazene
 Etonitazene
 Etonitazepipne
 Isotonitazene
 Metonitazene

References 

Analgesics
Designer drugs
Benzimidazole opioids
Nitro compounds
Pyrrolidines